Kapali may refer to any of the following.
 Kapali or Kapalika, a Hindu sect of ascetics
 Kapali, the ninth of the eleven Rudras
 Kapali is one of the oldest and highly educated Bengali Hindu caste in West Bengal and Bangladesh ,they are belongs to the family of rishi kashyap and his son 9th rudra -kapali.after 1960s there are 2 sub caste -kapali and baishya kapali .At first they were known as Shiva worshipers and Rudraja Brahmins but now the Kapalis identify themselves as Kshatriyas and Vaishya Kapalis as they are involved in farming and trade.
 Kapali (Newar caste), a Newar caste in Nepal